Gul Hassan Khan (1921; b. 1921—10 October 1999), was a Pakistan Army senior general who served as the 6th and the last Commander-in-Chief of Pakistan Army, serving under President Zulfikar Ali Bhutto from 20 December 1971 until 3 March 1972.

He was succeeded by Tikka Khan, who was promoted to full general rank and designated as the Chief of Army Staff.

Biography

Early life and military career

Gul Hassan Khan was born in Quetta, Balochistan, British India into a middle class Pashtun family in 1921. In 1939, he was admitted and joined the Royal Indian Military College in Dehradun and moved to the Indian Military Academy at Dehra Dun in January 1941. He was an excellent Hockey player and gained fame as boxer at the Military Academy.

In 22 February 1942, he was commissioned as a 2nd Lieutenant in the 9th battalion of the Frontier Force Rifles and was later transferred to the Armoured Corps. He was later stationed in Assam with Assam Rifles and participated in Burma Campaign in 1944–45 on the side of the Great Britain. During World War II, he selected to serve as Aide-de-Camp (ADC) to General Viscount Slim who commanded the 14th Army.

During the war with India in 1965, he was the Director of Military Operations, DMO and directed military operations against the Indian Army. His actions of valor won him the nomination of prestigious Sitara-e-Pakistan by the President. After the 1965 war, he was promoted to Maj. Gen. and was made the GOC of the 1st Armoured Division headquartered in Multan, Punjab. In December 1966, he was posted to General Headquarters as the Chief of General Staff (CGS), and was promoted to Lieutenant General while serving in this post in 1971.

Role in 1971 Black September

According to the testimonies provided by Major-General A.O. Mitha, it was Gul Hasan's lobbying at the Army GHQ who also saved then Brigadier Zia-ul-Haq (Chief of Pakistan military mission) from being terminated. Brigadier Zia who was in Jordan in 1971 was recommended to be court-martialled by Major-General Nawazish in his submission to President Yahya Khan for disobeying GHQ orders by commanding a Jordanian armoured division against the Palestinians, as part of actions in which thousands were killed. That event is known as "Operation Black September". It was Gul Hasan who interceded for Zia and Yahya Khan let Zia off the hook.

1971 war and Bangladesh

In 1971, he was the Chief of General Staff at the Army GHQ and allegedly either executed or approved military operations in East Pakistan. As CGS of Pakistan Army, he was heading the military operations and intelligence during this period. It is also alleged that he was the "intellectual planner" of Pakistan Army's crackdown in the East and that he preferred a military solution of the political crisis looming over the horizon of Pakistan during 1971. He lacked foresight as was viewed by some of his colleagues in Pakistan Army as "short on strategic vision but good as field commander".

He, along with Air Marshal A.R. Khan, played a crucial role in forcing Yahya Khan to step down from the presidency.

Army Chief (1971–72)

After the 1971 war which ended with unilateral surrender to India, President Zulfikar Ali Bhutto called Lieutenant-General Gul Hassan to take over the post of Commander in Chief of Pakistan Army, which he refused. However, he reluctantly accepted the post on several of his set conditions and took over the command of Pakistan Army. In controversy, Khan was avoided to be promoted the four-star rank as opposed to his predecessors, by Bhutto.
Initially, he provided his support to President Bhutto but began obstructing the hearings of Hamoodur Rahman Commission. Reports were surfacing that Gul Hassan Khan, along with Air Marshal A.R. Khan, were interfering in state's affairs and influencing on Hamoodur Rahman Commission.

As Army Commander-in-Chief, he lessened the role and value of the Inter–Services Intelligence which lost its importance throughout this time, and the new Army Commander did not pay any attention to ISI as he relied on Intelligence Bureau (IB) instead. The ISI's covert operations were never revealed to him and Khan was reluctant and incompetent commander to control the ISI; instead the ISI began directly reporting to President Bhutto.

In 1972, the Hamoodur Rahman Commission implicated him for his role in atrocities committed in East Pakistan which eventually led towards his termination. Upon approval of his termination papers, the Governor of Punjab Ghulam Mustafa Khar allegedly huddled up in a car and taken to Lahore. Khan's alleged involvement and his controversial approvals of military operations during 1971 in East Pakistan created a public resentment towards him, as he was the Director-General of the Director-general for the Military Operations (DGMO). When it was cleared by Hamoodur Rahman Commission, led by Chief Justice Hamoodur Rahman, Bhutto fired Khan as Army Commander-in-Chief and appointed General Tikka Khan instead.

Diplomatic career
After his stint as the commander-in-chief of Pakistan Army, Khan was appointed as Pakistan's ambassador to Austria. He also served as ambassador to Greece from April 1975 to April 1977. He resigned from the latter position in protest against alleged rigging during the 1977 Pakistani general election.

Family
He had three brothers and a sister. He has relatives still residing in Pabbi Nowshera District, and in Quetta, Pakistan. General Gul Hassan Khan died in 1999 and was buried in Pabbi in Nowshera District (Main town of Chirrat Cant, Chowki Mumriaz, Taroo Jaba, Akber Pura).

In the last few years of his life he was dividing his time between Vienna, Austria and Rawalpindi, Pakistan. He has one son, Sher Hassan Khan, who resides in Vienna with his mother. He wrote a book Memoirs of Lt. Gen. Gul Hassan Khan.

See also
General Sahabzada Yaqub Khan
General Musa Khan
General Rao Farman Ali
General Mitha

References

Further reading
 Gul Hassan Khan, Memoirs of Lt.Gen.Gul Hassan Khan, OUP Pakistan (1994)

External links
Official profile at Pakistan Army website
Article about General Gul Hassan 

1921 births
1999 deaths
People from Quetta
Pashtun people
Rashtriya Indian Military College alumni
Indian Army personnel of World War II
Frontier Force Regiment officers
British Indian Army officers
Generals of the Indo-Pakistani War of 1971
Generals of the Bangladesh Liberation War
Commanders-in-Chief, Pakistan Army
Pakistani memoirists
Pakistan Armoured Corps officers
Pakistani generals
20th-century memoirists
Ambassadors of Pakistan to Austria
Ambassadors of Pakistan to Greece
Pakistan Command and Staff College alumni